Garcia Live Volume 15 is a two-CD live album by Jerry Garcia and Merl Saunders.  It was recorded on May 21, 1971 at the Keystone Korner in San Francisco.  It contains the complete concert from that date except for the encore, which was "Deal".  It was released on December 4, 2020.

At this show, Garcia (guitar, vocals) and Saunders (keyboards, vocals) played as a trio with drummer Bill Vitt.  Their usual bass player, John Kahn, was not present.  Saxophonist Martin Fierro sat in on some songs.  A few years later, Fierro would be a member of the Garcia / Saunders band called Legion of Mary.

Critical reception 
In Glide Magazine, Doug Collette wrote, "[The recording] derives from the early days of the longstanding collaboration between these two deeply kindred spirits and covers what is, in retrospect, very familiar stylistic ground in the nascent stages of exploration. Back cover disclaimer on audio quality aside, Fred Kevorkian's mastering of Jeff Ziegler's mix achieves the optimum combination of atmosphere and clarity... Garcia's work with Saunders allowed him extra freedom to stretch out in a more informal setting than with the Grateful Dead, the fruitful prospects for which were enhanced through the intimacy of a venue such as this two-hundred seat room. Accordingly, the ensemble artfully maintains a keen balance between restraint and expansion during the course of the largely instrumental, near-two hours total."

Track listing 
Disc one
First set:
 "Man-Child" (Merl Saunders, Ed Lewis) – 17:16
 "One Kind Favor" (Blind Lemon Jefferson) – 9:14
 "I Know It's a Sin" (Jimmy Reed, Mary Reed) – 6:58
 "I Was Made to Love Her" (Henry Cosby, Lula Mae Hardaway, Sylvia Moy, Stevie Wonder) – 9:58
 "Keystone Korner Jam" (Jerry Garcia, Saunders, Bill Vitt, Martin Fierro) – 16:28
 "The Night They Drove Old Dixie Down" (Robbie Robertson) – 5:04
Disc two
Second set:
 "Save Mother Earth" (Saunders, Lewis) – 25:19
 "That's All Right" (Jimmy Rogers) – 8:28
 "The Wall Song" (David Crosby) – 12:45
 "Mystery Train" (Junior Parker, Sam Phillips) – 6:44

Personnel 
Musicians
 Jerry Garcia – guitar, vocals
 Merl Saunders – keyboards, vocals
 Bill Vitt – drums
 Martin Fierro – saxophone on "I Was Made to Love Her", "Keystone Korner Jam", "Save Mother Earth", "That's All Right", "The Wall Song"

Production
 Produced by Marc Allan, Kevin Monty
 Project Coordination by Lauren Goetzinger
 Mixing: Jeff Zeigler
 Mastering: Fred Kevorkian
 Design, illustration: Ryan Corey
 Liner notes essay: Benjy Eisen
 Photos: Bob Gruen, Dr. Bob Marks, Brian McMillen, Roberto Rabanne

References 

Jerry Garcia live albums
Merl Saunders albums
2020 live albums